Overton Township is a township in Bradford County, Pennsylvania, United States. It is part of Northeastern Pennsylvania. The population was 247 at the 2010 census.

Geography
Overton Township is located in southern Bradford County and is bordered by Leroy Township to the west, Franklin Township to the north, Monroe Township to the northeast, and Albany Township to the east. To the south, in Sullivan County are (from east to west) Cherry Township, Forks Township, Elkland Township, and Fox Township. The unincorporated community of Overton is located in the far southeastern corner of the township.

Demographics

As of the census of 2000, there were 187 people, 78 households, and 53 families residing in the township.  The population density was 4.0 people per square mile (1.5/km).  There were 266 housing units at an average density of 5.7/sq mi (2.2/km).  The racial makeup of the township was 98.40% White and 1.60% Native American.

There were 78 households, out of which 26.9% had children under the age of 18 living with them, 59.0% were married couples living together, 5.1% had a female householder with no husband present, and 30.8% were non-families. 24.4% of all households were made up of individuals, and 14.1% had someone living alone who was 65 years of age or older.  The average household size was 2.40 and the average family size was 2.85.

In the township the population was spread out, with 19.8% under the age of 18, 3.7% from 18 to 24, 30.5% from 25 to 44, 28.9% from 45 to 64, and 17.1% who were 65 years of age or older.  The median age was 44 years. For every 100 females, there were 107.8 males.  For every 100 females age 18 and over, there were 108.3 males.

The median income for a household in the township was $26,667, and the median income for a family was $31,250. Males had a median income of $33,750 versus $16,875 for females. The per capita income for the township was $13,727.  About 16.0% of families and 12.1% of the population were below the poverty line, including none of those under the age of eighteen and 19.4% of those sixty five or over.

References

Populated places established in 1806
Townships in Bradford County, Pennsylvania
Townships in Pennsylvania
1806 establishments in Pennsylvania